The Mount Nemo Conservation Area in Burlington, Ontario is a conservation area owned and operated by Conservation Halton. It is popular with rock climbers in the Greater Toronto Area and the Golden Horseshoe, along with nearby Rattlesnake Point Conservation Area.  Its five kilometers of hiking trails connect with the Bruce Trail.

Rock climbing

The rock type is limestone and most of the routes climbed are sport climbing. The sport climbing begins with a 5.9 but the majority of climbs fall in the 5.10 to 5.12 range. Due to its proximity to major urban areas, Mount Nemo is one of the most popular climbing destinations in Southwestern Ontario.

Conservation Halton has implemented a ban on top rope climbing to protect the ancient cedar trees along the Niagara Escarpment.

Caving
There are various cave systems running through the rock. Caving is a very popular activity at Mount Nemo, with the various caves offering great opportunities for enthusiasts from beginner to advanced skill sets.

External links

Conservation Halton: Mount Nemo Conservation Area

Climbing areas of Canada
Conservation areas in Ontario
Protected areas of the Regional Municipality of Halton
Niagara Escarpment